The syntax and semantics of PHP, a programming language, form a set of rules that define how a PHP program can be written and interpreted.

Overview 

Historically, the development of PHP has been somewhat haphazard. To counter this, the PHP Framework Interop Group (FIG) has created The PHP Standards Recommendation (PSR) documents that have helped bring more standardization to the language since 2009. The modern coding standards are contained in PSR-1 (Basic Coding Standard) and PSR-2 (Coding Style Guide).

Keywords 
Some keywords represent things that look like functions, some look like constants, but they are actually language constructs. It is forbidden to use any keywords as constants, class names, functions or methods. Using them as variable names is allowed, but it can be confusing.

__halt_compiler() 	
abstract
and
array() 	
as
break
callable (as of PHP 5.4) 	
case 	
catch 	
class
clone 	
const 	
continue 	
declare
default
die() 	
do
echo 	
else 	
elseif
empty() 	
enddeclare 	
endfor
endforeach 	
endif
endswitch 	
endwhile 	
eval() 	
exit() 	
extends
final 	
finally (as of PHP 5.5) 	
fn (as of PHP 7.4) 	
for 	
foreach
function 	
global 	
goto (as of PHP 5.3) 	
if 	
implements
include 	
include_once 	
instanceof 	
insteadof (as of PHP 5.4) 	
interface
isset() 	
list() 	
match (as of PHP 8.0) 	
namespace (as of PHP 5.3) 	
new
or 	
print 	
private 	
protected 	
public
require 	
require_once 	
return 	
static 	
switch
throw
trait (as of PHP 5.4) 	
try 	
unset() 	
use
var 	
while 	
xor 	
yield (as of PHP 5.5) 	
yield from (as of PHP 7.0)

Basic language constructs 

PHP generally follows C syntax, with exceptions and enhancements for its main use in web development, which makes heavy use of string manipulation. PHP variables must be prefixed by "$". This allows PHP to perform string interpolation in double quoted strings, where backslash is supported as an escape character. No escaping or interpolation is done on strings delimited by single quotes. PHP also supports a C-like sprintf function. Code can be modularized into functions defined with keyword function. PHP supports an optional object oriented coding style, with classes denoted by the class keyword. Functions defined inside classes are sometimes called methods. Control structures include: if, while, do/while, for, foreach, and switch. Statements are terminated by a semicolon, not line endings.

Delimiters 

The PHP processor only parses code within its delimiters. Anything outside its delimiters is sent directly to the output and not parsed by PHP. The only open/close delimiters allowed by PSR-1 are "<?php" and "?>" or <?= and ?>.

The purpose of the delimiting tags is to separate PHP code from non-PHP data (mainly HTML). Although rare in practice, PHP will execute code embedded in any file passed to its interpreter, including binary files such as PDF or JPEG files, or in server log files. Everything outside the delimiters is ignored by the PHP parser and is passed through as output.

These recommended delimiters create correctly formed XHTML and other XML documents. This may be helpful if the source code documents ever need to be processed in other ways during the life of the software.

If proper XML validation is not an issue, and a file contains only PHP code, it is preferable to omit the PHP closing (?>) tag at the end of the file.

Non-recommended tags 

Other delimiters can be used on some servers, though most are no longer supported. Examples are:

 "<script language="php">" and "<code></script></code>" (removed in PHP7)
 Short opening tags (<?) (configured with the short_open_tag ini setting)
 A special form of the <? tag is <?=, which automatically echos the next statement. Prior to PHP 5.4.0 this was also controlled with short_open_tag, but is always available in later versions.
 ASP style tags (<% or <%=) (removed in PHP7)

Variables and comments 
Variables are prefixed with a dollar symbol and a type does not need to be specified in advance. Unlike function and class names, variable names are case-sensitive. Both double-quoted ("") and heredoc strings allow the ability to embed a variable's value into the string. As in C, variables may be cast to a specific type by prefixing the type in parentheses. PHP treats newlines as whitespace, in the manner of a free-form language. (dot). Array elements are accessed and set with square brackets in both associative arrays and indexed arrays. Curly brackets can be used to access array elements, but not to assign.

PHP has three types of comment syntax: /* */ which serves as block comments, and // as well as # which are used for inline comments. Many examples use the print function instead of the echo function. Both functions are nearly identical; the major difference being that print is slower than echo because the former will return a status indicating if it was successful or not in addition to text to output, whereas the latter does not return a status and only returns the text for output.

Simplest program 

The usual "Hello World" code example for PHP is:

<?php
echo "Hello World!\n";
?>

The example above outputs the following:
Hello World!
Instead of using <?php and the echo statement, an optional "shortcut" is the use of <?= instead of <?php which implicitly echoes data. For example:
<!DOCTYPE html>
<html>
    <head>
        <title>PHP "Hello, World!" program</title>
    </head>
    <body>
        <p><?="Hello World!"?></p>
    </body>
</html>

The above example also illustrates that text not contained within enclosing PHP tags will be directly output.

Operators

PHP supports: arithmetic operators, assignment operators, bitwise operators, comparison operators, error control operators, execution operators, increment/decrement operators, logical operators, string operators, array operators, conditional assignment operators.

Control structures

Conditionals

If ... else statement 
The syntax of a PHP if ... else statement is as follows:

if (condition) {
    // statements;
} elseif (condition2) {
    // statements;
} else {
    // statements;
}

For single statements, the brackets may be omitted and the if optionally condensed to a single line:

if (condition) dosomething();
elseif (condition2) dosomethingelse();
else doyetathirdthing();

Ternary conditional operator 

$abs = $value >= 0 ? $value : -$value;

/* Equivalent to */

if ($value >= 0) {
    $abs = $value;
} else {
    $abs = -$value;
}

Elvis operator 

Since PHP 5.3 supports Elvis operator (?:) in which it is possible to omit the middle part of the ternary operator.
$c = $a ?: $b; 

/* Equivalent to */

$c = $a ? $a : $b;

Null coalescing operator 

Since version 7.0 PHP also supports Null coalescing operator (??).
$a = $b ?? $c;

/* Equivalent to */

$a = isset($b) ? $b : $c;
Since version 7.4 PHP also supports Null coalescing operator with the ??= syntax.
$a ??= $b;

/* Equivalent to */

$a = $a ?? $b;

Safe navigation operator 

Since version 8.0 PHP also supports Safe navigation operator (?->).
$variable = $object?->method();

/* Equivalent to */

$variable =  $object !== null ? $object->method() : null;

Switch statement 

An example of the syntax of a PHP switch statement is as follows:

switch (expr) {
    case 0:
      // statements;
      break;
    case 1:
      // statements;
      break;
    case 2:
      // statements;
      break;
    default:
      // statements;
}

Note that unlike in C, values in case statement can be any type, not just integers.

Match expression 
PHP 8 introduces the  expression. The match expression is conceptually similar to a  statement and is more compact for some use cases.

echo match (1) {
    0 => 'Foo',
    1 => 'Bar',
    2 => 'Baz',
};
//> Bar

Loops

For loop 

The PHP syntax of a for loop is as follows:

for (initialization; condition; afterthought) {
    // statements;
}

While loop 

The syntax for a PHP while loop is as follows:

while (condition) {
    // statements;
}

Do while loop 

The syntax for a PHP do while loop is as follows:

do {
    // statements;
} while (condition);

For each loop 

The syntax for a PHP for each loop is as follows:

foreach ($set as $value) {
    // statements;
}

Alternative syntax for control structures 
PHP offers an alternative syntax using colons rather than the standard curly-brace syntax (of "{...}").  This syntax affects the following control structures: if, while, for, foreach, and switch. The syntax varies only slightly from the curly-brace syntax.  In each case the opening brace ({) is replaced with a colon and the close brace is replaced with endif;, endwhile;, endfor;, endforeach;, or endswitch;, respectively.  Mixing syntax styles within the same control block is not supported. An example of the syntax for an if/elseif statement is as follows:

if (condition):
     // code here
elseif (condition):
     // code here
else:
     // code here
endif;

This style is sometimes called template syntax, as it is often found easier to read when combining PHP and HTML or JavaScript for conditional output:

<html>
<?php if ($day == 'Thursday'): ?>
  <div>Tomorrow is Friday!</div>
<?php elseif ($day == 'Friday'): ?>
  <div>TGIF</div>
<?php else: ?>
  <div>ugh</div>
<?php endif; ?>
</html>

Exception handling 

Runtime exception handling method in PHP is inherited from C++.

function inv($x)
{
    if ($x == 0) {
        throw new Exception('Division by zero');
    }
    return 1 / $x;
}

try {
    echo inv(2); // prints 0.5
    echo inv(0); // throw an exception
    echo inv(5); // will not run
} catch (Exception $e) {
    echo  $e->getMessage(); // prints Division by zero 
}

// Continue execution
echo "Hello"; // prints Hello

Data types

Scalar types 

PHP supports four scalar types: bool, int, float, string.

Boolean 

PHP has a native Boolean type, named "bool", similar to the native Boolean types in Java and C++. Using the Boolean type conversion rules, non-zero values are interpreted as true and zero as false, as in Perl.
Both constants true and false are case-insensitive.

Integer 

PHP stores whole numbers in a platform-dependent range. This range is typically that of 32-bit or 64-bit signed integers. Integer variables can be assigned using decimal (positive and negative), octal and hexadecimal notations.
$a = 1234; // decimal number
$b = 0321; // octal number (equivalent to 209 decimal)
$c = 0x1B; // hexadecimal number (equivalent to 27 decimal)
$d = 0b11; // binary number (equivalent to 3 decimal)
$e = 1_234_567; // decimal number (as of PHP 7.4.0)

Float 

Real numbers are also stored in a platform-specific range. They can be specified using floating point notation, or two forms of scientific notation.
$a = 1.234;
$b = 1.2e3;     // 1200
$c = 7E-5;      // 0.00007
$d = 1_234.567; // as of PHP 7.4.0

String 

PHP supports strings, which can be used with single quotes, double quotes, nowdoc or heredoc syntax.

Double quoted strings support variable interpolation:
$age = '23';

echo "John is $age years old"; // John is 23 years old
Curly braces syntax:
$f = "sqrt";
$x = 25;

echo "a$xc\n";   // Warning:  Undefined variable $xc
echo "a{$x}c\n"; // prints a25c
echo "a${x}c\n"; // also prints a25c

echo "$f($x) is {$f($x)}\n"; // prints sqrt(25) is 5

Special types 

PHP supports two special types: null, resource.
The null data type represents a variable that has no value. The only value in the null data type is NULL. The NULL constant is not case sensitive. Variables of the "resource" type represent references to resources from external sources. These are typically created by functions from a particular extension, and can only be processed by functions from the same extension. Examples include file, image and database resources.

Compound types 

PHP supports four compound types: array, object, callable, iterable.

Array 

Arrays can contain mixed elements of any type, including resources, objects. Multi-dimensional arrays are created by assigning arrays as array elements. PHP has no true array type. PHP arrays are natively sparse and associative. Indexed arrays are simply hashes using integers as keys.

Indexed array:
$season = ["Autumn", "Winter", "Spring", "Summer"];  
echo $season[2]; // Spring
Associative array:
$salary = ["Alex" => 34000, "Bill" => 43000, "Jim" => 28000];  
echo $salary["Bill"]; // 43000
Multidimensional array:
$mark = [
    "Alex" => [
        "biology" => 73,
        "history" => 85
    ],
    "Jim" => [
        "biology" => 86,
        "history" => 92
    ]
];

echo $mark["Jim"]["history"];  // 92

Object 

The object data type is a combination of variables, functions and data structures in the object-oriented programming paradigm.
class Person
{
    //...
}

$person = new Person();

Callable 

Since version 5.3 PHP has first-class functions that can be used e.g. as an argument to another function.
function runner(callable $function, mixed ...$args)
{
    return $function(...$args);
}

$f = fn($x, $y) => $x ** $y;

function sum(int|float ...$args)
{
    return array_sum($args);
}

echo runner(fn($x) => $x ** 2, 2); // prints 4
echo runner($f, 2, 3); // prints 8
echo runner('sum', 1, 2, 3, 4); // prints 10

Iterable 

Iterable type indicate that variable can be used with foreach loop. It can be any array or generator or object that implementing the special internal Traversable interface.

function printSquares(iterable $data)
{
    foreach ($data as $value) {
        echo ($value ** 2) . " ";
    }

    echo "\n";
}

// array 
$array = [1, 2, 3, 4, 5, 6, 7, 8, 9, 10];

// generator 
$generator = function: Generator {
    for ($i = 1; $i <= 10; $i++) {
        yield  $i;
    }
};

// object
$arrayIterator = new ArrayIterator([1, 2, 3, 4, 5, 6, 7, 8, 9, 10]);

printSquares($array);         // 1 4 9 16 25 36 49 64 81 100
printSquares($generator());   // 1 4 9 16 25 36 49 64 81 100
printSquares($arrayIterator); // 1 4 9 16 25 36 49 64 81 100

Union types 

Union types were introduced in PHP 8.0
    function foo(string|int $foo): string|int {}

Functions

PHP has hundreds of base functions and thousands more from extensions. Prior to PHP version 5.3.0, functions are not first-class functions and can only be referenced by their name, whereas PHP 5.3.0 introduces closures. User-defined functions can be created at any time and without being prototyped. Functions can be defined inside code blocks, permitting a run-time decision as to whether or not a function should be defined. There is no concept of local functions. Function calls must use parentheses with the exception of zero argument class constructor functions called with the PHP new operator, where parentheses are optional.

An example function definition is the following:

function hello($target='World')
{
    echo "Hello $target!\n";
}

hello(); // outputs "Hello World!"
hello('Wikipedia'); // outputs "Hello Wikipedia!"

Function calls may be made via variables, where the value of a variable contains the name of the function to call. This is illustrated in the following example:
function hello()
{
    return 'Hello';
}

function world()
{
    return "World!";
}

$function1 = 'hello';
$function2 = 'world';

echo "{$function1()} {$function2()}";

A default value for parameters can be assigned in the function definition, but prior to PHP 8.0 did not support named parameters or parameter skipping. Some core PHP developers have publicly expressed disappointment with this decision. Others have suggested workarounds for this limitation.

Named arguments 

Named arguments were introduced in PHP 8.0 
function power($base, $exp)
{
    return $base ** $exp;
}

// Using positional arguments:
echo power(2, 3); // prints 8

// Using named arguments:
echo power(base: 2, exp: 3); // prints 8
echo power(exp: 3, base: 2); // prints 8

Type declaration 
Specifying the types of function parameters and function return values has been supported since PHP 7.0.

Return type declaration:
function sum($a, $b): float 
{
    return $a + $b;
}

var_dump(sum(1, 2)); // prints float(3)

Parameters typing:
function sum(int $a, int $b)
{
    return $a + $b;
}

var_dump(sum(1, 2));     // prints int(3)
var_dump(sum(1.6, 2.3)); // prints int(3)

Strict typing 
Without strict typing enabled:
$f1 = fn ($a, $b): int => $a + $b;
$f2 = fn (int $a, int $b) => $a + $b;

var_dump($f1(1.3, 2.6)); // prints int(3)
var_dump($f1(1, '2'));   // prints int(3)
var_dump($f2(1.3, 2.6)); // prints int(3)
var_dump($f2(1, '2'));   // prints int(3)
With strict typing enabled:
declare(strict_types=1);

$f1 = fn ($a, $b): int => $a + $b;
$f2 = fn (int $a, int $b) => $a + $b;

var_dump($f1(1.3, 2.6)); // Fatal error: Return value must be of type int, float returned
var_dump($f1(1, '2'));   // prints int(3)
var_dump($f2(1.3, 2.6)); // Fatal error: Argument #1 ($a) must be of type int, float given
var_dump($f2(1, '2'));   // Fatal error: Argument #2 ($b) must be of type int, string given

Anonymous functions 

PHP supports true anonymous functions as of version 5.3. In previous versions, PHP only supported quasi-anonymous functions through the create_function() function.

$x = 3;
$func = function($z) { return $z * 2; };
echo $func($x); // prints 6

Since version 7.4 PHP also supports arrow functions syntax (=>).

$x = 3;
$func = fn($z) => $z * 2;
echo $func($x); // prints 6

Closures 

Сreating closures
$add = fn($x) => fn($y) => $y + $x;

/* Equivalent to */

$add = function ($x) {
    return function ($y) use ($x) {
        return $y + $x;
    };
};
using 
$f = $add(5);

echo $f(3);       // prints 8
echo $add(2)(4);  // prints 6

Generators

Using generators, we can write code that uses foreach to iterate over a dataset without having to create an array in memory, which can result in memory overhead or significant processing time for generation.

Objects

Basic object-oriented programming functionality was added in PHP 3. Object handling was completely rewritten for PHP 5, expanding the feature set and enhancing performance. In previous versions of PHP, objects were handled like primitive types. The drawback of this method was that the whole object was copied when a variable was assigned or passed as a parameter to a method. In the new approach, objects are referenced by handle, and not by value. PHP 5 introduced private and protected member variables and methods, along with abstract classes and final classes as well as abstract methods and final methods. It also introduced a standard way of declaring constructors and destructors, similar to that of other object-oriented languages such as C++, and a standard exception handling model. Furthermore PHP 5 added Interfaces and allows for multiple Interfaces to be implemented. There are special interfaces that allow objects to interact with the runtime system. Objects implementing ArrayAccess can be used with array syntax and objects implementing Iterator or IteratorAggregate can be used with the foreach language construct. The static method and class variable features in Zend Engine 2 do not work the way some would expect. There is no virtual table feature in the engine, so static variables are bound with a name instead of a reference at compile time.

This example shows how to define a class, Foo, that inherits from class Bar. The method myStaticMethod is a public static method that can be called with Foo::myStaticMethod();.

class Foo extends Bar
{
    function __construct()
    {
        $doo = "wah dee dee";
    }

    public static function myStaticMethod()
    {
        $dee = "dee dee dum";
    }
}

If the developer creates a copy of an object using the reserved word clone, the Zend engine will check if a __clone() method has been defined or not. If not, it will call a default __clone() which will copy the object's properties. If a __clone() method is defined, then it will be responsible for setting the necessary properties in the created object. For convenience, the engine will supply a function that imports the properties of the source object, so that the programmer can start with a by-value replica of the source object and only override properties that need to be changed.

Traits

See also 
 Hypertext Markup Language (HTML)
 Template engine (web)

References 

Programming language syntax
PHP software